Lithuanian broadcaster LRT announced their participation for Junior Eurovision Song Contest 2010 in August 2010. The National Final, "Vaiku Eurovizija" chose Bartas, the 14‑year-old singer to represent Lithuania in the Junior Eurovision Song Contest 2010.

Before Junior Eurovision

Vaikų Eurovizijos nacionalinė atranka 
The national selection show Vaikų Eurovizijos nacionalinė atranka consisted of two semi-finals held on 12 and 19 September 2010 and a final held on 26 September 2010.

The results of the semi-finals were determined by a 50/50 combination of votes from a jury panel and public televoting. In the final, the winner was chosen in two rounds of voting - the first to select the top three by the 50/50 combination of jury voting and public televoting, and the second to select the winner by the jury.

Semi-final 1
The first semi-final was held on 12 September 2010. 10 songs competed and 7 qualified to the next round instead of the initially-planned 5 due to a three-way tie for fifth place.

Semi-final 2
Semi-Final 2 was held on 19 September 2010. 10 songs competed and 5 participants qualified, since there was no tiebreak.

Final
The final was held on 26 September 2010 at the LRT TV Studios in Vilnius, where 12 participants competed instead of the initially-planned 10, as this was the first time that a qualify-rule was broken due to the first semi-final having seven finalists. The winner was chosen in two rounds of voting. In the first round the top 3 were chosen by televoting (50%) and a nine-member "expert" jury (50%), while in the second round the winner was chosen by the "expert" jury.

At Junior Eurovision

Voting

Notes

References

Junior Eurovision Song Contest
Junior
Lithuania